The Assam Legislative Assembly  is the unicameral legislature of the Indian state of Assam. It is housed in Dispur, the capital of Assam, geographically situated in present Western Assam region. The Legislative Assembly comprises 126 Members of Legislative Assembly, directly elected from single-seat constituencies. Its term is five years, unless sooner dissolved.

History
The number of constituencies of Assam Legislative Assembly at the time of its inception on 7 April 1937 was 108. In 1957 it was reduced to 105. In 1962, the number of constituencies was enhanced to 114 and since 1972, it is 126. Since 1976, 8 constituencies are reserved for the Scheduled castes candidates and 16 constituencies are reserved for Scheduled tribes candidates. Dispur constituency in Kamrup Metropolitan district with 3.53 lakh voters is the largest constituency in Assam.

List of Assam Legislative constituencies
Following is the list of the constituencies of Assam Legislative Assembly, since the delimitation of the legislative assembly constituencies in 1976:

References

External links 
 

Assam
Assam-related lists